The name Bullough may refer to:
 Edward Bullough (1880–1934), English aesthetician and scholar of modern languages
 Edward Bullough (1866–1934), English rugby union footballer
 Hank Bullough (1934-2019), American football coach
 James Bullough (1800–1868), English inventor of the 1842 Lancashire Loom
 Denis Bullough (born 1895), British football player
 James Bullough Lansing (1902–1949), American engineer
 Robin Bullough (1929–2008), British mathematical physicist
 Sir George Bullough, 1st Baronet (1870–1939), English businessman, soldier, and Thoroughbred racehorse owner and breeder
 Vern Bullough (1928–2006), American historian and sexologist
 Donald A. Bullough (1928–2002) British medieval historian 
 Riley Bullough (born 1993), American football player, Michigan State University

See also

 Bullough-Dodd
 Bullough's Pond
 Reflections in Bullough's Pond